The results of the 2017 Little League World Series were determined between August 17 and August 27, 2017 in South Williamsport, Pennsylvania. 16 teams were divided into two groups, one with eight teams from the United States and another with eight international teams, with both groups playing a modified double-elimination tournament. In each group, the last remaining undefeated team faced the last remaining team with one loss, with the winners of those games advancing to play for the Little League World Series championship.

Double-elimination stage

United States

Winner's bracket

Game 2: Connecticut 7, New Jersey 6

Game 4: Texas 5, Michigan 1

Game 6: California 9, Washington 0

Game 8: North Carolina 6, South Dakota 0

Game 14: Texas 6, Connecticut 3

Game 16: North Carolina 16, California 0

Game 24: North Carolina 2, Texas 1

Loser's bracket

Game 10: New Jersey 15, Michigan 5

Game 12: Washington 4, South Dakota 3

Game 18: New Jersey 12, California 9

Game 20: Connecticut 14, Washington 6

Game 22: Connecticut 12, New Jersey 2

Game 26: Texas 14, Connecticut 4

International

Winner's bracket

Game 1: Venezuela 4, Mexico 1

Game 3: Canada 12, Italy 2

Game 5: Japan 8, Australia 0

Game 7: South Korea 10, Dominican Republic 1

Game 13: Canada 7, Venezuela 3

Game 15: Japan 4, South Korea 1

Game 23: Japan 10, Canada 0

Loser's bracket

Game 9: Mexico 13, Italy 0

Game 11: Dominican Republic 8, Australia 7

Game 17: Mexico 1, South Korea 0

Game 19: Venezuela 3, Dominican Republic 2

Game 21: Mexico 8, Venezuela 0

Game 25: Mexico 6, Canada 2

Consolation games

Game A:  Michigan 11, Italy 7

Game B: Australia 11, South Dakota 7

Single-elimination stage

International championship: Japan 5, Mexico 0

United States championship: Texas 6, North Carolina 5

Third place game: Mexico 14, North Carolina 8

World championship: Japan 12, Texas 2

References

External links
Full schedule from littleleague.org 

2017 Little League World Series